LIFER/LADDER was one of the first database natural language processing systems. It was designed as a natural language interface to a database of information about US Navy ships. This system, as described in a paper by Hendrix (1978), used a semantic grammar to parse questions and query a distributed database. 

The LIFER/LADDER system could only support simple one-table queries or multiple table queries with easy join conditions.

Some examples of queries it could accept:
What are the length, width, and draft of the Kitty Hawk?
When will Reeves achieve readiness rating C2?
What is the nearest ship to Naples with a doctor on board?
What ships are carrying cargo for the United States?
Where are they going?
Print the American cruisers’ current positions and states of readiness?

References

History of artificial intelligence
United States Navy